West Wycombe railway station was a railway station that served the village of West Wycombe, Buckinghamshire  Situated about  east of the village the station opened in 1862 and closed in 1958. Minutes of the Wycombe Railway state that construction of West Wycombe station in 1862 cost £430 8s 8d, with additional general works at £417 8s 8d, .

In the late 1980s, the then operator of the Chiltern Lines Network SouthEast suggested reopening West Wycombe station in order to ease the peak hour congestion at the main High Wycombe station. However, no detailed plans were ever published, and there has been no further suggestion of reopening the station by the current operator, the Arriva owned Chiltern Railways. Chiltern Railways has invested heavily in both infrastructure and rolling stock for the Chiltern group of lines.

History

West Wycombe original station was an intermediate station on the Wycombe Railway and opened on 1 August 1862. The station was provided with a single platform and a station building of typical Wycombe Railway design which was repeated exactly at Princes Risborough and Wheatley, although other stations Cookham, Marlow Road, Wooburn Green, Loudwater and Bledlow had the same design with an additional crossing keeper's house attached.

West Wycombe station was rebuilt in 1906 and provided with a new two platform station. There are a number of photographs of both the original Wycombe railway stations taken by SWA Newton.

Passenger services were withdrawn from West Wycombe on 3 November 1958. The line remains active, and plans for reopening the station have been discussed. A reopened station would serve the extensive western suburbs of High Wycombe.

This station has now been demolished and now has a coach car park and flats built on some of the land.

Routes

Notes

References

External links 
 The station on navigable 1946 O. S. map
 Photograph of station circa 1905

Disused railway stations in Buckinghamshire
Former Great Western and Great Central Joint Railway stations
Railway stations in Great Britain opened in 1862
Railway stations in Great Britain closed in 1958
1862 establishments in Scotland